Figure skating at the 2017 Asian Winter Games was held in Sapporo, Japan between 23–26 February at the Makomanai Ice Arena. A total of four events were contested: men's and women's singles, pairs and ice dancing.

China finished first in medal table, winning two gold medals.

Schedule

Medalists

Medal table

Participating nations
A total of 75 athletes from 17 nations competed in figure skating at the 2017 Asian Winter Games:

 
 
 
 
 
 
 
 
 
 
 
 
 
 
 
 
 

* Australia as guest nation, was ineligible to win any medals.

References

External links
Official website
Official Results Book – Figure Skating

 
2017 Asian Winter Games events
2017
2017
2017 in figure skating